Fu Heng Estate is a mixed TPS and public housing estate in Tai Po, New Territories, Hong Kong. It consists of eight residential blocks built in 1990. Some of the flats were sold to tenants through Tenants Purchase Scheme Phase 3 in 2000.

Chung Nga Court is a Home Ownership Scheme court in Tai Po, near Fu Heng Estate. It consists of three residential buildings built in 1991.

Houses

Fu Heng Estate

Chung Nga Court

Demographics
According to the 2016 by-census, Fu Heng Estate had a population of 17,452 while Chung Nga Court had a population of 5,506. Altogether the population amounts to 22,958.

Politics
For the 2019 District Council election, the estate fell within two constituencies. Most of the estate is located in the Fu Heng constituency, which is currently represented by William Ho Wai-lam, while Heng Tai House and Chung Nga Court falls within the Chung Ting constituency, which was formerly represented by Man Nim-chi until July 2021.

See also

Public housing estates in Tai Po

References

Residential buildings completed in 1990
Public housing estates in Hong Kong
Tenants Purchase Scheme
Tai Po